Karol Adwentowicz (19 October 1871 – 19 July 1958) was a Polish actor and theater director. Adwentowicz fought in the Polish Legions in World War I, and upon the return of Poland's sovereignty, embarked on a hugely successful touring career across the country. During the Nazi occupation of Poland he was imprisoned in Pawiak. He died in Warsaw, two years after the Polish October.

Adwentowicz directed plays and performed in several theaters both before and during the war, including at the Słowacki Theatre in Kraków in 1912 commissioned by Ludwik Solski. In the interwar Poland he ran the experimental Ateneum Theatre in Warsaw along with Stefan Jaracz (1933–34 season), but also founded the Teatr Kameralny in the city. Adwentowicz was one of the most recognized dramatic actors in contemporary Poland, particularly for his role as Hamlet.

Filmography

Notes

External links
 

1871 births
1958 deaths
Polish male actors
Polish theatre directors
Polish Legions in World War I
Recipients of the State Award Badge (Poland)